The 2001 Short Track Speed Skating World Cup was a multi-race tournament over a season for short track speed skating. The season began on 20 October 2000 and ended on 4 February 2001. The World Cup was organised by the ISU.

Men

Events

World Cup Rankings

Women

Events

World Cup Rankings

Podium summary

References 
Results

ISU Short Track Speed Skating World Cup
World Cup
World Cup